Hirahara (written: 平原) is a Japanese surname. Notable people with the surname include:

, Japanese singer
, Japanese classical pianist and composer
Naomi Hirahara (born 1962), Japanese-American mystery author

See also
, a train station in Komoro City, Nagano Prefecture, Japan

Japanese-language surnames